Thermothrix thiopara is a Gram-negative, facultatively chemolithoautotrophic, thermophilic, motile bacterium with a single polar flagellum of the genus Thermothrix, isolated from a hot sulfur spring.

References 

Burkholderiaceae
Bacteria described in 1981